Livin' it Up is the tenth studio album by American country music singer George Strait, released in 1990 on MCA Records. It has been certified platinum by the RIAA. The tracks "Drinking Champagne", "Love Without End, Amen", and "I've Come to Expect It From You" were all released as singles; "Drinking Champagne" was a #4 hit on the Hot Country Songs charts, while the other two singles were both Number One hits. "She Loves Me (She Don't Love You)" was written and originally recorded by Conway Twitty, and was later recorded on Gary Allan's 1998 album It Would Be You.

"Lonesome Rodeo Cowboy" was first recorded by Strait and The Ace in the Hole Band in the 1970s and was the B-side to "(That Don't Change) The Way I Feel About You", the latter of which is included on Strait Out of the Box.

Track listing

Personnel
 Eddie Bayers – drums
 Joe Chemay – bass guitar
 Floyd Domino – piano
 Paul Franklin – steel guitar, pedabro
 Steve Gibson – acoustic guitar
 Johnny Gimble – fiddle
 Jim Horn – saxophone
 George Strait – lead vocals
 Curtis Young – background vocals
 Liana Young – background vocals
 Reggie Young – electric guitar

The Ace in the Hole Band
On "Someone Had to Teach You" and "She Loves Me (She Don't Love You)"
 David Anthony – acoustic guitar
 Mike Daily – steel guitar
 Gene Elders – fiddle
 Phil Fisher – drums
 Terry Hale – bass
 Ronnie Huckaby – piano
 Benny MacArthur – electric guitar
 Rick McRae – electric guitar

Production
 Jimmy Bowen – producer
 George Strait – producer
 Tom Perry – recording, mixing, overdub recording
 Bob Bullock – recording, mixing
 Russ Martin – overdub recording
 Tim Kish – overdub recording
 Glenn Meadows – mastering
 Milan Bogdan – digital editing
 Jessie Noble – project coordinator

Charts

Weekly charts

Year-end charts

Certifications

References

1990 albums
George Strait albums
MCA Records albums
Albums produced by Jimmy Bowen